Frank McGurk (19 June 1915, in Los Angeles, California – 7 February 1982, in Escondido, California) was an American racecar driver.

Indy 500 results

References

1915 births
1982 deaths
Indianapolis 500 drivers
Sportspeople from Escondido, California
Racing drivers from Los Angeles